Mosaheb Ali Khan was a Member of the 3rd National Assembly of Pakistan as a representative of East Pakistan, representing Mymensingh-III..

References

Pakistani MNAs 1962–1965
Living people
Year of birth missing (living people)